Cancer immunotherapy (sometimes called immuno-oncology) is the stimulation of the immune system to treat cancer, improving on the immune system's natural ability to fight the disease. It is an application of the fundamental research of cancer immunology and a growing subspecialty of oncology.

Cancer immunotherapy exploits the fact that cancer cells often have tumor antigens, molecules on their surface that can be detected by the antibody proteins of the immune system, binding to them. The tumor antigens are often proteins or other macromolecules (e.g., carbohydrates). Normal antibodies bind to external pathogens, but the modified immunotherapy antibodies bind to the tumor antigens marking and identifying the cancer cells for the immune system to inhibit or kill. Clinical success of cancer immunotherapy is highly variable between different forms of cancer; for instance, certain subtypes of gastric cancer react well to the approach whereas immunotherapy is not effective for other subtypes.

In 2018, American immunologist James P. Allison and Japanese immunologist Tasuku Honjo received the Nobel Prize in Physiology or Medicine for their discovery of cancer therapy by inhibition of negative immune regulation.

History 
"During the 17th and 18th centuries, various forms of immunotherapy in cancer became widespread... In the 18th and 19th centuries, septic dressings enclosing ulcerative tumours were used for the treatment of cancer. Surgical wounds were left open to facilitate the development of infection, and purulent sores were created deliberately... One of the most well-known effects of microorganisms on ... cancer was reported in 1891, when an American surgeon, William Coley, inoculated patients having inoperable tumours with [ Streptococcus pyogenes ]." "Coley [had] thoroughly reviewed the literature available at that time and found 38 reports of cancer patients with accidental or iatrogenic feverish erysipelas. In 12 patients, the sarcoma or carcinoma had completely disappeared; the others had substantially improved. Coley decided to attempt the therapeutic use of iatrogenic erysipelas..." "Coley developed a toxin that contained heat-killed bacteria [ Streptococcus pyogenes and Serratia marcescens ]. Until 1963, this treatment was used for the treatment of sarcoma." "Coley injected more than 1000 cancer patients with bacteria or bacterial products." 51.9% of [Coley's] patients with inoperable soft-tissue sarcomas showed complete tumour regression and survived for more than 5 years, and 21.2% of the patients had no clinical evidence of tumour at least 20 years after this treatment..."  Research continued in the 20th century under Dr. Maria O'Connor Hornung at Tulane Medical School

Categories 
Immunotherapies can be categorized as active or passive. Active immunotherapy specifically targets tumor cells via the immune system. Examples include therapeutic cancer vaccines (also known as treatment vaccines, which are designed to boost the body's immune system to fight cancer), CAR-T cell, and targeted antibody therapies. In contrast, passive immunotherapy does not directly target tumor cells, but enhances the ability of the immune system to attack cancer cells. Examples include checkpoint inhibitors and cytokines.

Active cellular therapies aim to destroy cancer cells by recognition of distinct markers known as antigens. In cancer vaccines, the goal is to generate an immune response to these antigens through a vaccine. Currently, only one vaccine (sipuleucel-T for prostate cancer) has been approved. In cell-mediated therapies like CAR-T cell therapy, immune cells are extracted from the patient, genetically engineered to recognize tumor-specific antigens, and returned to the patient. Cell types that can be used in this way are natural killer (NK) cells, lymphokine-activated killer cells, cytotoxic T cells and dendritic cells. Finally, specific antibodies can be developed that recognize cancer cells and target them for destruction by the immune system. Examples of such antibodies include rituximab (targeting CD-20), trastuzumab (targeting HER-2), and cetuximab (targeting EGFR).

Passive antibody therapies aim to increase the activity of the immune system without specifically targeting cancer cells. For example, cytokines directly stimulate the immune system and increase immune activity. Checkpoint inhibitors target proteins (immune checkpoints) that normally dampen the immune response. This enhances the ability of the immune system to attack cancer cells. Current research is identifying new potential targets to enhance immune function. Approved checkpoint inhibitors include antibodies such as ipilimumab, nivolumab, and pembrolizumab.

Cellular immunotherapy

Dendritic cell therapy

Dendritic cell therapy provokes anti-tumor responses by causing dendritic cells to present tumor antigens to lymphocytes, which activates them, priming them to kill other cells that present the antigen. Dendritic cells are antigen-presenting cells (APCs) in the mammalian immune system. In cancer treatment they aid cancer antigen targeting. The only approved cellular cancer therapy based on dendritic cells is sipuleucel-T.

One method of inducing dendritic cells to present tumor antigens is by vaccination with autologous tumor lysates or short peptides (small parts of protein that correspond to the protein antigens on cancer cells). These peptides are often given in combination with adjuvants (highly immunogenic substances) to increase the immune and anti-tumor responses. Other adjuvants include proteins or other chemicals that attract and/or activate dendritic cells, such as granulocyte macrophage colony-stimulating factor (GM-CSF). The most common source of antigens used for dendritic cell vaccine in glioblastoma (GBM) as an aggressive brain tumor were whole tumor lysate, CMV antigen RNA and tumor-associated peptides like EGFRvIII.

Dendritic cells can also be activated in vivo by making tumor cells express GM-CSF. This can be achieved by either genetically engineering tumor cells to produce GM-CSF or by infecting tumor cells with an oncolytic virus that expresses GM-CSF.

Another strategy is to remove dendritic cells from the blood of a patient and activate them outside the body. The dendritic cells are activated in the presence of tumor antigens, which may be a single tumor-specific peptide/protein or a tumor cell lysate (a solution of broken down tumor cells). These cells (with optional adjuvants) are infused and provoke an immune response.

Dendritic cell therapies include the use of antibodies that bind to receptors on the surface of dendritic cells. Antigens can be added to the antibody and can induce the dendritic cells to mature and provide immunity to the tumor. Dendritic cell receptors such as TLR3, TLR7, TLR8 or CD40 have been used as antibody targets. Dendritic cell-NK cell interface also has an important role in immunotherapy. The design of new dendritic cell-based vaccination strategies should also encompass NK cell-stimulating potency. It is critical to systematically incorporate NK cells monitoring as an outcome in antitumor DC-based clinical trials.

Drugs 
Sipuleucel-T (Provenge) was approved for treatment of asymptomatic or minimally symptomatic metastatic castration-resistant prostate cancer in 2010. The treatment consists of removal of antigen-presenting cells from blood by leukapheresis and growing them with the fusion protein PA2024 made from GM-CSF and prostate-specific prostatic acid phosphatase (PAP) and reinfused. This process is repeated three times.

CAR-T cell therapy 

The premise of CAR-T immunotherapy is to modify T cells to recognize cancer cells in order to target and destroy them. Scientists harvest T cells from people, genetically alter them to add a chimeric antigen receptor (CAR) that specifically recognizes cancer cells, then infuse the resulting CAR-T cells into patients to attack their tumors.

Approved drugs 
Tisagenlecleucel (Kymriah), a chimeric antigen receptor (CAR-T) therapy, was approved by FDA in 2017 to treat acute lymphoblastic leukemia (ALL). This treatment removes CD19 positive cells (B-cells) from the body (including the diseased cells, but also normal antibody-producing cells).

Axicabtagene ciloleucel (Yescarta) is another CAR-T therapeutic, approved in 2017 for treatment of diffuse large B-cell lymphoma (DLBCL).

T cell receptor T cell therapy 

TCR-T therapies use heterodimers made of alpha and beta peptide chains to recognize MHC-presented polypeptide fragments molecules. Unlike CAR-T's cell surface antigens, TCR-T can recognize that larger set of intracellular antigen fragments. However, TCR-T cell therapy depends on MHC molecules, limiting its usefulness.

Multifunctional alginate scaffolds for T cell engineering and release 
Multifunctional alginate scaffolds for T cell engineering and release (MASTER) is a technique for in situ engineering, replication and release of genetically engineered T cells. It is an evolution of CAR T cell therapy. T cells are extracted from the patient and mixed with a genetically engineered virus that contains a cancer targeting gene (as with CAR T). The mixture is then added to a MASTER (scaffold), which absorbs them. The MASTER contains antibodies that activate the T cells and interleukins that trigger cell proliferation. The MASTER is then implanted into the patient. The activated T cells interact with the viruses to become CAR T cells. The interleukins stimulate these CAR T cells to proliferate, and the CAR T cells exit the MASTER to attack the cancer. The technique takes hours instead of weeks. And because the cells are younger, they last longer in the body, show stronger potency against cancer, and display fewer markers of exhaustion. These features were demonstrated in mouse models. The treatment was more effective and longer lasting against lymphoma.

Antibody therapy

Antibodies are a key component of the adaptive immune response, playing a central role in both recognizing foreign antigens and stimulating an immune response. Antibodies are Y-shaped proteins produced by some B cells and are composed of two regions: an antigen-binding fragment (Fab), which binds to antigens, and a fragment crystallizable (Fc) region, which interacts with so-called Fc receptors that are expressed on the surface of different immune cell types including macrophages, neutrophils and NK cells. Many immunotherapeutic regimens involve antibodies. Monoclonal antibody technology engineers and generates antibodies against specific antigens, such as those present on tumor surfaces. These antibodies which are specific to the antigens of the tumor can then be injected into a tumor.

Antibody types

Conjugation 

Two types are used in cancer treatments:

 Naked monoclonal antibodies are antibodies without added elements. Most antibody therapies use this antibody type.
 Conjugated monoclonal antibodies are joined to another molecule, which is either cytotoxic or radioactive. The toxic chemicals are those typically used as chemotherapy drugs, but other toxins can be used. The antibody binds to specific antigens on cancer cell surfaces, directing the therapy to the tumor. Radioactive compound-linked antibodies are referred to as radiolabelled. Chemolabelled or immunotoxins antibodies are tagged with chemotherapeutic molecules or toxins, respectively. Research has also demonstrated conjugation of a TLR agonist to an anti-tumor monoclonal antibody.

Fc regions 
Fc's ability to bind Fc receptors is important because it allows antibodies to activate the immune system. Fc regions are varied: they exist in numerous subtypes and can be further modified, for example with the addition of sugars in a process called glycosylation. Changes in the Fc region can alter an antibody's ability to engage Fc receptors and, by extension, will determine the type of immune response that the antibody triggers. For example, immune checkpoint blockers targeting PD-1 are antibodies designed to bind PD-1 expressed by T cells and reactivate these cells to eliminate tumors. Anti-PD-1 drugs contain not only a Fab region that binds PD-1 but also an Fc region. Experimental work indicates that the Fc portion of cancer immunotherapy drugs can affect the outcome of treatment. For example, anti-PD-1 drugs with Fc regions that bind inhibitory Fc receptors can have decreased therapeutic efficacy. Imaging studies have further shown that the Fc region of anti-PD-1 drugs can bind Fc receptors expressed by tumor-associated macrophages. This process removes the drugs from their intended targets (i.e. PD-1 molecules expressed on the surface of T cells) and limits therapeutic efficacy. Furthermore, antibodies targeting the co-stimulatory protein CD40 require engagement with selective Fc receptors for optimal therapeutic efficacy. Together, these studies underscore the importance of Fc status in antibody-based immune checkpoint targeting strategies.

Human/non-human antibodies 
Antibodies can come from a variety of sources, including human cells, mice, and a combination of the two (chimeric antibodies). Different sources of antibodies can provoke different kinds of immune responses. For example, the human immune system can recognize mouse antibodies (also known as murine antibodies) and trigger an immune response against them. This could reduce the effectiveness of the antibodies as a treatment and cause an immune reaction. Chimeric antibodies attempt to reduce murine antibodies' immunogenicity by replacing part of the antibody with the corresponding human counterpart. Humanized antibodies are almost completely human; only the complementarity determining regions of the variable regions are derived from murine sources. Human antibodies have been produced using unmodified human DNA.

Mechanism of Action

Antibody-dependent cell-mediated cytotoxicity (ADCC)
Antibody-dependent cell-mediated cytotoxicity (ADCC) requires antibodies to bind to target cell surfaces. Antibodies are formed of a binding region (Fab) and the Fc region that can be detected by immune system cells via their Fc surface receptors. Fc receptors are found on many immune system cells, including NK cells. When NK cells encounter antibody-coated cells, the latter's Fc regions interact with their Fc receptors, releasing perforin and granzyme B to kill the tumor cell. Examples include rituximab, ofatumumab, elotuzumab, and alemtuzumab. Antibodies under development have altered Fc regions that have higher affinity for a specific type of Fc receptor, FcγRIIIA, which can dramatically increase effectiveness.

Complement Activation
The complement system includes blood proteins that can cause cell death after an antibody binds to the cell surface (the classical complement pathway, among the ways of complement activation). Generally, the system deals with foreign pathogens but can be activated with therapeutic antibodies in cancer. The system can be triggered if the antibody is chimeric, humanized, or human; as long as it contains the IgG1 Fc region. Complement can lead to cell death by activation of the membrane attack complex, known as complement-dependent cytotoxicity; enhancement of antibody-dependent cell-mediated cytotoxicity; and CR3-dependent cellular cytotoxicity. Complement-dependent cytotoxicity occurs when antibodies bind to the cancer cell surface, the C1 complex binds to these antibodies and subsequently, protein pores are formed in cancer cell membrane.

Blocking

Antibody therapies can also function by binding to proteins and physically blocking them from interacting with other proteins. Checkpoint inhibitors (CTLA-4, PD-1, and PD-L1) operate by this mechanism. Briefly, checkpoint inhibitors are proteins that normally help to slow immune responses and prevent the immune system from attacking normal cells. Checkpoint inhibitors bind these proteins and prevent them from functioning normally, which increases the activity of the immune system. Examples include durvalumab, ipilimumab, nivolumab, and pembrolizumab.

FDA-approved antibodies

Alemtuzumab
Alemtuzumab (Campath-1H) is an anti-CD52 humanized IgG1 monoclonal antibody indicated for the treatment of fludarabine-refractory chronic lymphocytic leukemia (CLL), cutaneous T-cell lymphoma, peripheral T-cell lymphoma and T-cell prolymphocytic leukemia. CD52 is found on >95% of peripheral blood lymphocytes (both T-cells and B-cells) and monocytes, but its function in lymphocytes is unknown. It binds to CD52 and initiates its cytotoxic effect by complement fixation and ADCC mechanisms. Due to the antibody target (cells of the immune system), common complications of alemtuzumab therapy are infection, toxicity and myelosuppression.

Durvalumab

Durvalumab (Imfinzi) is a human immunoglobulin G1 kappa (IgG1κ) monoclonal antibody that blocks the interaction of programmed cell death ligand 1 (PD-L1) with the PD-1 and CD80 (B7.1) molecules. Durvalumab is approved for the treatment of patients with locally advanced or metastatic urothelial carcinoma who:
 have disease progression during or following platinum-containing chemotherapy.
 have disease progression within 12 months of neoadjuvant or adjuvant treatment with platinum-containing chemotherapy.
On 16 February 2018, the Food and Drug Administration approved durvalumab for patients with unresectable stage III non-small cell lung cancer (NSCLC) whose disease has not progressed following concurrent platinum-based chemotherapy and radiation therapy.

Ipilimumab
Ipilimumab (Yervoy) is a human IgG1 antibody that binds the surface protein CTLA4. In normal physiology T-cells are activated by two signals: the T-cell receptor binding to an antigen-MHC complex and T-cell surface receptor CD28 binding to CD80 or CD86 proteins. CTLA4 binds to CD80 or CD86, preventing the binding of CD28 to these surface proteins and therefore negatively regulates the activation of T-cells.

Active cytotoxic T-cells are required for the immune system to attack melanoma cells. Normally inhibited active melanoma-specific cytotoxic T-cells can produce an effective anti-tumor response. Ipilimumab can cause a shift in the ratio of regulatory T-cells to cytotoxic T-cells to increase the anti-tumor response. Regulatory T-cells inhibit other T-cells, which may benefit the tumor.

Nivolumab 
Nivolumab is a human IgG4 antibody that prevents T-cell inactivation by blocking the binding of programmed cell death 1 ligand 1 or programmed cell death 1 ligand 2 (PD-L1 or PD-L2), a protein expressed by cancer cells, with PD-1, a protein found on the surface of activated T-cells. Nivolumab is used in advanced melanoma, metastatic renal cell carcinoma, advanced lung cancer, advanced head and neck cancer, and Hodgkin's lymphoma.

Ofatumumab 
Ofatumumab is a second generation human IgG1 antibody that binds to CD20. It is used in the treatment of chronic lymphocytic leukemia (CLL) because the cancerous cells of CLL are usually CD20-expressing B-cells. Unlike rituximab, which binds to a large loop of the CD20 protein, ofatumumab binds to a separate, small loop. This may explain their different characteristics. Compared to rituximab, ofatumumab induces complement-dependent cytotoxicity at a lower dose with less immunogenicity.

Pembrolizumab 
As of 2019, pembrolizumab, which blocks PD-1, programmed cell death protein 1, has been used via intravenous infusion to treat inoperable or metastatic melanoma, metastatic non-small cell lung cancer (NSCLC) in certain situations, as a second-line treatment for head and neck squamous cell carcinoma (HNSCC), after platinum-based chemotherapy, and for the treatment of adult and pediatric patients with refractory classic Hodgkin's lymphoma (cHL). It is also indicated for certain patients with urothelial carcinoma, stomach cancer and cervical cancer.

Rituximab 
Rituximab is a chimeric monoclonal IgG1 antibody specific for CD20, developed from its parent antibody Ibritumomab. As with ibritumomab, rituximab targets CD20, making it effective in treating certain B-cell malignancies. These include aggressive and indolent lymphomas such as diffuse large B-cell lymphoma and follicular lymphoma and leukemias such as B-cell chronic lymphocytic leukemia. Although the function of CD20 is relatively unknown, CD20 may be a calcium channel involved in B-cell activation. The antibody's mode of action is primarily through the induction of ADCC and complement-mediated cytotoxicity. Other mechanisms include apoptosis and cellular growth arrest. Rituximab also increases the sensitivity of cancerous B-cells to chemotherapy.

Cytokine therapy
Cytokines are proteins produced by many types of cells present within a tumor. They can modulate immune responses. The tumor often employs them to allow it to grow and reduce the immune response. These immune-modulating effects allow them to be used as drugs to provoke an immune response. Two commonly used cytokines are interferons and interleukins.

Interleukin-2 and interferon-α are cytokines, proteins that regulate and coordinate the behavior of the immune system. They have the ability to enhance anti-tumor activity and thus can be used as passive cancer treatments. Interferon-α is used in the treatment of hairy-cell leukaemia, AIDS-related Kaposi's sarcoma, follicular lymphoma, chronic myeloid leukaemia and malignant melanoma. Interleukin-2 is used in the treatment of malignant melanoma and renal cell carcinoma.

Interferon
Interferons are produced by the immune system. They are usually involved in anti-viral response, but also have use for cancer. They fall in three groups: type I (IFNα and IFNβ), type II (IFNγ) and type III (IFNλ). IFNα has been approved for use in hairy-cell leukaemia, AIDS-related Kaposi's sarcoma, follicular lymphoma, chronic myeloid leukaemia and melanoma. Type I and II IFNs have been researched extensively and although both types promote anti-tumor immune system effects, only type I IFNs have been shown to be clinically effective. IFNλ shows promise for its anti-tumor effects in animal models.

Unlike type I IFNs, Interferon gamma is not approved yet for the treatment of any cancer. However, improved survival was observed when Interferon gamma was administrated to patients with bladder carcinoma and melanoma cancers. The most promising result was achieved in patients with stage 2 and 3 of ovarian carcinoma. The in vitro study of IFN-gamma in cancer cells is more extensive and results indicate anti-proliferative activity of IFN-gamma leading to the growth inhibition or cell death, generally induced by apoptosis but sometimes by autophagy.

Interleukin
Interleukins have an array of immune system effects. Interleukin-2 is used in the treatment of malignant melanoma and renal cell carcinoma. In normal physiology it promotes both effector T cells and T-regulatory cells, but its exact mechanism of action is unknown.

Combination immunotherapy

Combining various immunotherapies such as PD1 and CTLA4 inhibitors can enhance anti-tumor response leading to durable responses.

Combining ablation therapy of tumors with immunotherapy enhances the immunostimulating response and has synergistic effects for curative metastatic cancer treatment.

Combining checkpoint immunotherapies with pharmaceutical agents has the potential to improve response, and such combination therapies are a highly investigated area of clinical investigation. Immunostimulatory drugs such as CSF-1R inhibitors and TLR agonists have been particularly effective in this setting.

Polysaccharide-K
Japan's Ministry of Health, Labour and Welfare approved the use of polysaccharide-K extracted from the mushroom, Coriolus versicolor, in the 1980s, to stimulate the immune systems of patients undergoing chemotherapy. It is a dietary supplement in the US and other jurisdictions.

Genetic pre-testing for therapeutic significance
Because of the high cost of many of immunotherapy medications and the reluctance of medical insurance companies to prepay for their prescriptions various test methods have been proposed, to attempt to forecast the effectiveness of these medications. The detection of PD-L1 protein seemed to be an indication of cancer susceptible to several immunotherapy medications, but research found that both the lack of this protein or its inclusion in the cancerous tissue was inconclusive, due to the little-understood varying quantities of the protein during different times and locations within the infected cells and tissue.

In 2018 some genetic indications such as Tumor Mutational Burden (TMB, the number of mutations within a targeted genetic region in the cancerous cell's DNA), and microsatellite instability (MSI, the quantity of impaired DNA mismatch leading to probable mutations), have been approved by the FDA as good indicators for the probability of effective treatment of immunotherapy medication for certain cancers, but research is still in progress. The patient prioritization for immunotherapy based on TMB is still highly controversial.

In some cases the FDA has approved genetic tests for medication that is specific to certain genetic markers. For example, the FDA approved BRAF associated medication for metastatic melanoma, to be administered to patients after testing for the BRAF genetic mutation.

Tests of this sort are being widely advertised for general cancer treatment and are expensive. In the past, some genetic testing for cancer treatment has been involved in scams such as the Duke University Cancer Fraud scandal, or claimed to be hoaxes.

Research

Adoptive T-cell therapy

Adoptive T cell therapy is a form of passive immunization by the transfusion of T-cells (adoptive cell transfer). They are found in blood and tissue and usually activate when they find foreign pathogens. Specifically they activate when the T-cell's surface receptors encounter cells that display parts of foreign proteins on their surface antigens. These can be either infected cells, or antigen-presenting cells (APCs). They are found in normal tissue and in tumor tissue, where they are known as tumor infiltrating lymphocytes (TILs). They are activated by the presence of APCs such as dendritic cells that present tumor antigens. Although these cells can attack the tumor, the environment within the tumor is highly immunosuppressive, preventing immune-mediated tumour death.

Multiple ways of producing and obtaining tumour targeted T-cells have been developed. T-cells specific to a tumor antigen can be removed from a tumor sample (TILs) or filtered from blood. Subsequent activation and culturing is performed ex vivo, with the results reinfused. Activation can take place through gene therapy, or by exposing the T cells to tumor antigens.

As of 2014, multiple ACT clinical trials were underway. Importantly, one study from 2018 showed that clinical responses can be obtained in patients with metastatic melanoma resistant to multiple previous immunotherapies.

The first 2 adoptive T-cell therapies, tisagenlecleucel and axicabtagene ciloleucel, were approved by the FDA in 2017.

Another approach is adoptive transfer of haploidentical γδ T cells or NK cells from a healthy donor. The major advantage of this approach is that these cells do not cause GVHD. The disadvantage is frequently impaired function of the transferred cells.

Anti-CD47 therapy

Many tumor cells overexpress CD47 to escape immunosurveilance of host immune system. CD47 binds to its receptor signal-regulatory protein alpha (SIRPα) and downregulate phagocytosis of tumor cell. Therefore, anti-CD47 therapy aims to restore clearance of tumor cells. Additionally, growing evidence supports the employment of tumor antigen-specific T cell response in response to anti-CD47 therapy. A number of therapeutics are being developed, including anti-CD47 antibodies, engineered decoy receptors, anti-SIRPα antibodies and bispecific agents. As of 2017, wide range of solid and hematologic malignancies were being clinically tested.

Anti-GD2 antibodies

Carbohydrate antigens on the surface of cells can be used as targets for immunotherapy. GD2 is a ganglioside found on the surface of many types of cancer cell including neuroblastoma, retinoblastoma, melanoma, small cell lung cancer, brain tumors, osteosarcoma, rhabdomyosarcoma, Ewing's sarcoma, liposarcoma, fibrosarcoma, leiomyosarcoma and other soft tissue sarcomas. It is not usually expressed on the surface of normal tissues, making it a good target for immunotherapy. As of 2014, clinical trials were underway.

Immune checkpoints  

Immune checkpoints affect the immune system function. Immune checkpoints can be stimulatory or inhibitory. Tumors can use these checkpoints to protect themselves from immune system attacks. Currently approved checkpoint therapies block inhibitory checkpoint receptors. Blockade of negative feedback signaling to immune cells thus results in an enhanced immune response against tumors. Immune checkpoint blockade therapies have varied effectiveness. In Hodgkin lymphoma and natural killer T-cell lymphoma, response rates are high, at 50–60%. Response rates are quite low for breast and prostate cancers, however.

One ligand-receptor interaction under investigation is the interaction between the transmembrane programmed cell death 1 protein (PDCD1, PD-1; also known as CD279) and its ligand, PD-1 ligand 1 (PD-L1, CD274). PD-L1 on the cell surface binds to PD1 on an immune cell surface, which inhibits immune cell activity. Among PD-L1 functions is a key regulatory role on T cell activities. It appears that (cancer-mediated) upregulation of PD-L1 on the cell surface may inhibit T cells that might otherwise attack. PD-L1 on cancer cells also inhibits FAS- and interferon-dependent apoptosis, protecting cells from cytotoxic molecules produced by T cells. Antibodies that bind to either PD-1 or PD-L1 and therefore block the interaction may allow the T-cells to attack the tumor.

CTLA-4 blockade 

The first checkpoint antibody approved by the FDA was ipilimumab, approved in 2011 for the treatment of melanoma. It blocks the immune checkpoint molecule CTLA-4. Clinical trials have also shown some benefits of anti-CTLA-4 therapy on lung cancer or pancreatic cancer, specifically in combination with other drugs. In on-going trials the combination of CTLA-4 blockade with PD-1 or PD-L1 inhibitors is tested on different types of cancer.

However, patients treated with checkpoint blockade (specifically CTLA-4 blocking antibodies), or a combination of check-point blocking antibodies, are at high risk of having immune-related adverse events such as dermatologic, gastrointestinal, endocrine, or hepatic autoimmune reactions. These are most likely due to the breadth of the induced T-cell activation when anti-CTLA-4 antibodies are administered by injection in the bloodstream.

Using a mouse model of bladder cancer, researchers have found that a local injection of a low dose anti-CTLA-4 in the tumour area had the same tumour inhibiting capacity as when the antibody was delivered in the blood. At the same time the levels of circulating antibodies were lower, suggesting that local administration of the anti-CTLA-4 therapy might result in fewer adverse events.

PD-1 inhibitors

Initial clinical trial results with IgG4 PD1 antibody nivolumab were published in 2010. It was approved in 2014. Nivolumab is approved to treat melanoma, lung cancer, kidney cancer, bladder cancer, head and neck cancer, and Hodgkin's lymphoma. A 2016 clinical trial for non-small cell lung cancer failed to meet its primary endpoint for treatment in the first line setting, but is FDA approved in subsequent lines of therapy.

Pembrolizumab (Keytruda) is another PD1 inhibitor that was approved by the FDA in 2014. Pembrolizumab is approved to treat melanoma and lung cancer.

Antibody BGB-A317 is a PD-1 inhibitor (designed to not bind Fc gamma receptor I) in early clinical trials.

PD-L1 inhibitors

In May 2016, PD-L1 inhibitor atezolizumab was approved for treating bladder cancer.

Anti-PD-L1 antibodies currently in development include avelumab and durvalumab, in addition to an inhibitory affimer.

CISH

Other modes of enhancing [adoptive] immuno-therapy include targeting so-called intrinsic checkpoint blockades e.g. CISH. Many cancer patients do not respond to immune checkpoint blockade. Response rate may be improved by combining immune checkpoint blockade with additional rationally selected anticancer therapies, including those that stimulate T cell infiltration. For example, targeted therapies such as radiotherapy, vasculature targeting agents, and immunogenic chemotherapy can improve immune checkpoint blockade response in animal models.

Oncolytic virus
An oncolytic virus is a virus that preferentially infects and kills cancer cells. As the infected cancer cells are destroyed by oncolysis, they release new infectious virus particles or virions to help destroy the remaining tumour. Oncolytic viruses are thought not only to cause direct destruction of the tumour cells, but also to stimulate host anti-tumour immune responses for long-term immunotherapy.

The potential of viruses as anti-cancer agents was first realized in the early twentieth century, although coordinated research efforts did not begin until the 1960s. A number of viruses including adenovirus, reovirus, measles, herpes simplex, Newcastle disease virus and vaccinia have now been clinically tested as oncolytic agents. T-Vec is the first FDA-approved oncolytic virus for the treatment of melanoma. A number of other oncolytic viruses are in Phase II-III development.

Polysaccharides

Certain compounds found in mushrooms, primarily polysaccharides, can up-regulate the immune system and may have anti-cancer properties. For example, beta-glucans such as lentinan have been shown in laboratory studies to stimulate macrophage, NK cells, T cells and immune system cytokines and have been investigated in clinical trials as immunologic adjuvants.

Neoantigens 
Many tumors express mutations. These mutations potentially create new targetable antigens (neoantigens) for use in T-cell immunotherapy. The presence of CD8+ T cells in cancer lesions, as identified using RNA sequencing data, is higher in tumors with a high mutational burden. The level of transcripts associated with the cytolytic activity of natural killer cells and T cells positively correlates with mutational load in many human tumors. In non–small cell lung cancer patients treated with lambrolizumab, mutational load shows a strong correlation with clinical response. In melanoma patients treated with ipilimumab, the long-term benefit is also associated with a higher mutational load, although less significantly. The predicted MHC binding neoantigens in patients with a long-term clinical benefit were enriched for a series of tetrapeptide motifs that were not found in tumors of patients with no or minimal clinical benefit. However, human neoantigens identified in other studies do not show the bias toward tetrapeptide signatures.

See also 
 Cancer vaccine
 Antigen 5T4
 Coley's toxins
 Combinatorial ablation and immunotherapy
 Cryoimmunotherapy
 Photoimmunotherapy

References

External links 
 A primer on "Immunotherapy to Treat Cancer", NIH
 Immunotherapy – Using the Immune System to Treat Cancer
 Cancer Research Institute – What is Cancer Immunotherapy
 Association for Immunotherapy of Cancer
 Society for Immunotherapy of Cancer
 
 
 

 
Monoclonal antibodies for tumors
Branches of immunology